Policordia pilula is a species of saltwater clams in the family Lyonsiellidae.

Morphology
This species has about 30 radial hair like lines on the shell.

Distribution
This species is recorded in China, Philippines and Japan.

References

Anomalodesmata